Jaume Vicens Vives (6 June 1910 in Girona, Spain – 28 June 1960 in Lyon, France) was a Spanish historian, and is considered, along with Pierre Vilar, one of the top influential Catalan historians of the 20th century.

According to Eliseo Climent Corberá, his 1954 book Notícia de Catalunya was a direct source and inspiration for Juan Fuster's influential 1962 book Nosaltres, els valencians. That book was to have been originally titled Nosaltres els catalans, but it was renamed under Josep Pla's advice, for fear of Francoist censorship. Fuster's work has the same structure and intention as Vicens' book does. The book was expanded and republished in 1960. Notícia de Catalunya had also a major influence on Jordi Pujol. Vicens was also a friend an influence for Juan Reglá.

References

Further reading
 Jackson, Gabriel. "The Historical Writing of Jaime Vicens Vives." American Historical Review (1970): 808-815. online
 Payne, Stanley G. “Jaime Vicens Vives and the Writing of Spanish History.” Journal of Modern History 34#2 (1962), pp. 119–134. online

1910 births
1960 deaths
20th-century Spanish historians
Spanish social scientists
Academic staff of the University of Barcelona
People from Girona
Members of the Institute for Catalan Studies